The 2022–23 PBA 3x3 season was the second season of the PBA 3x3, the 3x3 basketball league of the Philippine Basketball Association. TNT Tropang Giga completed the first ever PBA 3x3 Grand Slam by winning all conference Grand Finals.

Teams
All 12 franchise teams of the main 5-a-side Philippine Basketball Association are eligible to field a 3x3 team for the 2022–23 PBA 3x3 season, although the Converge FiberXers, Phoenix Super LPG Fuel Masters, and Rain or Shine Elasto Painters decided not to field a team. The Blackwater Bossing, who did not field a team in the inaugural season, debuted this season under the team name Blackwater Bossing Red President. Three guest teams (J&T Express, Pioneer, and Platinum) participated, with J&T Express debuting this season. The Limitless Appmasters and Sista Super Sealers (3x3 affiliate teams of Phoenix Super LPG Fuel Masters and Rain or Shine Elasto Painters, respectively), as well as guest teams Master Sardines Fishing Champs and Zamboanga Valientes, who all appeared during the previous season, took a leave of absence for this season.

Format
The season's format was highly similar to that of the previous season. The season had three tournaments or conferences. Each conference had six two-day legs and a grand final. The 12 teams are divided into four pools, with each pool having three teams. Teams within their pools play in a single round-robin format. The top two teams of each pool directly qualify for the quarterfinals, with qualified teams from Pool A facing those from Pool C, and qualified teams from Pool B facing those from Pool D. The knockout stage is a single-elimination tournament and a third place game is also held. The winner of each leg gets ₱100,000, the runner-up gets ₱50,000, while the third placed team gets ₱30,000. The seedings and pool compositions for each leg were based on the results of the preceding leg.

After six legs, the cumulative standings were calculated and the top four teams directly qualified for the quarterfinals of the Grand Finals. The fifth to tenth-placed teams qualified for the preliminary round of the Grand Finals. The bottom teams were not qualified for the Grand Finals. The Grand Champion gets ₱750,000, the runner-up gets ₱250,000, while the third placed team gets ₱100,000.

First conference

The conference started on September 10 and ended on October 30, 2022.

Legs summary

Grand Finals

Preliminary round

Pool A

Pool B

Knockout stage

Bracket
Seed refers to the position of the team after six legs. Letter and number inside parentheses denotes the pool letter and pool position of the team, respectively, after the preliminary round of the Grand Finals.

Second conference

The conference started on November 5 and ended on December 17, 2022.

Legs summary

Grand Finals

Preliminary round

Pool A

Pool B

Knockout stage

Bracket
Seed refers to the position of the team after six legs. Letter and number inside parentheses denotes the pool letter and pool position of the team, respectively, after the preliminary round of the Grand Finals.

Third conference

The conference started on January 14, 2023.

Legs summary

Grand Finals

Preliminary round

Pool A

Pool B

Knockout stage

Bracket
Seed refers to the position of the team after six legs. Letter and number inside parentheses denotes the pool letter and pool position of the team, respectively, after the preliminary round of the Grand Finals.

References

3x3
Pba